The American Veterinary Medical Association (AVMA), founded in 1863, is a not-for-profit association representing more than 99,500 veterinarians in the US.

The AVMA provides information resources, continuing education opportunities, publications, and discounts on personal and professional products, programs, and services. The AVMA indicates that it lobbies for animal friendly legislation within a framework that supports the use of animals for human purposes (e.g., food, fiber, research, companionship).

The AVMA Council on Education is the designated accrediting body for schools of veterinary medicine in the United States.

The AVMA publishes the Journal of the American Veterinary Medical Association (JAVMA) and the American Journal of Veterinary Research (AJVR).

The AVMA's veterinary student organization is the Student American Veterinary Medical Association (SAVMA).

History
The American Veterinary Medical Association (AVMA) was founded in 1863, when 40 delegates representing seven states met for a convention in New York. Originally named the United States Veterinary Medical Association, the USVMA was renamed the AVMA in 1889.

By 1913, the AVMA consisted of 1,650 members, with membership open only to graduates of accredited veterinary schools.

, the AVMA has more than 97,000 members. In addition to treating pets, veterinarians work in a number of fields, such as public health, agriculture, food safety, academics, and the military.

AVMA policy

The AVMA produces policies in response to member requests and stakeholder interest. These statements are general and aim to encourage improvement based on the best available scientific evidence.

In 2005, the AVMA changed its policy on pregnant sow housing, stating that "given the number of variables and large variation in performance within both group and stall systems for pregnant sows, no one system is clearly better than others under all conditions and according to all criteria of animal welfare". The AVMA's policy was adopted after a comprehensive review by a multi-disciplinary, multi-perspective task force of experts that produced an accompanying review of housing for pregnant sows.

The AVMA has voted on several proposals to take a formal stand against the forced feeding of birds to make foie gras. Although foie gras has been banned in many countries in Europe, as well as in the U.S. state of California, because of an absence of science specifically addressing the welfare aspects of foie gras production, as well as conflicting opinions among its membership, the AVMA opted not to take a stand either for or against foie gras. The AVMA has published a welfare implications of foie gras production backgrounder.

Legislation
AVMA supported the Veterinary Medicine Mobility Act of 2014, a law that amended the Controlled Substances Act (CSA) to clarify that veterinarians are not required to have separate registrations to dispense controlled substances outside of their principal place of business, such as when treating animals on a farm. AVMA argued that "the CSA must be amended so that our nation's animals do not suffer unnecessarily." Due to an interpretation of the law by the Drug Enforcement Administration, veterinarians were not allowed to travel to their off-site animal patients with controlled substances.

Academic Accreditation 
The United States Department of Education has designated the AVMA Council on Education as the accrediting body for schools of veterinary medicine in the United States. In this capacity, the AVMA develops and maintains educational standards for these institutions to ensure the qualifications and competency of graduates of veterinary schools.

Two bodies within AVMA are responsible for veterinary education accreditation: the AVMA Council on Education (COE) and the Committee on Veterinary Technician Education and Activities (CVTEA). The former is responsible for accreditation of veterinary colleges and the latter veterinary technology programs.

AVMA-accredited Veterinary Colleges 
, the following colleges were accredited by the AVMA.

 United States: Auburn University, Colorado State University, Cornell University, Iowa State University, Kansas State University, Lincoln Memorial University, Long Island University, Louisiana State University, Michigan State University, Midwestern University, Mississippi State University, North Carolina State University, Ohio State University, Oklahoma State University, Oregon State University, Purdue University, Texas A&M University, Texas Tech University, Tufts University, Tuskegee University, University of Arizona, University of California, Davis, University of Florida, University of Georgia, University of Illinois at Urbana–Champaign, University of Minnesota, University of Missouri, University of Pennsylvania, University of Tennessee, University of Wisconsin–Madison, Virginia–Maryland College of Veterinary Medicine, Washington State University, Western University of Health Sciences
 Australia: Murdoch University, University of Melbourne, University of Queensland, University of Sydney
 Canada: Université de Montréal, University of Calgary, University of Guelph, University of Prince Edward Island, University of Saskatchewan
 France: VetAgro Sup
 Ireland: University College Dublin
 Korea: Seoul National University
 Mexico: Universidad Nacional Autonoma de México
 Netherlands: Utrecht University
 New Zealand: Massey University
 United Kingdom: Royal Veterinary College, University of Bristol, University of Nottingham, University of Edinburgh, University of Glasgow
 West Indies: St. George's University, Ross University

AVMA-accredited Veterinary Technology Programs 
, the AVMA accredits veterinary technician programs in all but three U.S. states, one program in Canada, and a number of distance learning programs.

Specialists in veterinary medicine
According to the AVMA, a board-certified veterinary specialist is "a veterinarian who has completed additional training in a specific area of veterinary medicine and has passed an examination that evaluates their knowledge and skills in that specialty area."

, the AVMA recognizes 22 veterinary specialty organizations, including American College of Veterinary Anesthesia and Analgesia, American College of Veterinary Surgeons, and American College of Zoological Medicine. The AVMA recognizes 41 distinct veterinary specialties, including anesthesia, behavior, dentistry, parasitology, pathology, pharmacology, and surgery.

References

External links
 
 Journal of the American Veterinary Medical Association
 American Journal of Veterinary Research

1863 establishments in the United States
Health care-related professional associations based in the United States
Veterinary medicine-related professional associations
Veterinary medicine in the United States